The Speaker of the National Assembly of Zambia is a position established under Article 69(1) of the constitution. The Speaker is elected by members of the Assembly from anyone eligible to be elected to the National Assembly, but cannot be a sitting member.

History
The post of Speaker was first created on 10 November 1948 when the Governor appointed Thomas Spurgeon Page to preside over the Legislative Council following the 1948 general elections. Previously the Governor had also held the position of the President of the Legislative Council.

The Speakers of the Legislative Council were appointed by the Governor. Shortly after independence in 1964, appointed Speaker of the renamed National Assembly Thomas Williams stepped down and was replaced by Wesley Nyirenda, who was the MP for Fort Jameson. Nyrienda remained a constituency MP. After Nyirenda resigned in 1968, Speakers were appointed from outside the National Assembly by a vote of Assembly members.

List of speakers

References

External links
The National Assembly of Zambia

Zambia
Zambia
 
Lists of members of the National Assembly of Zambia